The Ritz-Carlton Jakarta is a hotel and skyscraper at Mega Kuningan in Jakarta, Indonesia, operated by The Ritz-Carlton Hotel Company, and adjacent to the sister JW Marriott Hotel. The complex has two towers, the hotel and the Airlangga Apartment. The hotel was opened in 2005.

The building is 212 m (696 ft) tall and has 48 floors and 4 basement levels. Construction on the building started in April 2003 and ended in October 2004. The Hotel has 278 Club level rooms and 55 Suites

It was bombed on 17 July 2009. The facade of the Ritz-Carlton was blown away by the blast and windows had been blown out of the Airlangga Restaurant on the second storey.

See also 
 List of tallest hotels in the world

References

External links 
 Ritz-Carlton Jakarta Web page
 Ritz-Carlton Jakarta in the Emporis database

Hotels in Jakarta
Skyscraper hotels
Buildings and structures in Jakarta
Hotels established in 2005
Hotel buildings completed in 2004
2005 establishments in Indonesia